The Bennettsville and Osborn Railroad was a railroad company that was incorporated to serve eastern South Carolina. The line was incorporated in February 1899 under a special act of the State of South Carolina as the Bennettsville and Osborne Railroad Company. Its name was changed in June 1902 to the Bennettsville and Cheraw Railroad Company.

References

Defunct South Carolina railroads
Railway companies established in 1899
Railway companies disestablished in 1902
1899 establishments in South Carolina